Nerine Martini (24 March 1968 – 25 April 2019), was an Australian artist working in the fields of sculpture, installation, drawing, socially engaged art and public art.

"Leaving a legacy of public artworks and community inspired projects, Nerine Martini was an artist who tapped in universal themes of migration and belonging.
Martini had an interest in working cross-culturally and creating artworks that respond to stories of migration, belonging, displacement, cultural identity and home. Interweaving personal and universal threads, her work poetically expressed concerns for humanity and our shared social and natural environments."

Career 

Martini’s work has been included in major exhibitions including Sculpture by the Sea, the Blake Prize and the Helen Lempriere National Sculpture Awards. Her work is held in collections such as Artbank Australia, artsACT, University of Sydney, College of Fine Arts, UNSW and the Seidler Collection. Martini taught fine arts at Nepean Art & Design Centre, and lectured in sculpture and object design at the Australian Catholic University.

Awards and honours 

 2014 Emerging Artist’s Award, Sculpture at Sawmillers
 2008 Popular Choice Award, Helen Lempriere National Sculpture Award
 2000 COFA Alumni Acquisitive Prize
 2000 Honorable Mention, Sculpture by the Sea
 1999 First Prize, Katoomba Art Street Prize, Blue Mountains City Council, NSW

Solo exhibitions 

 2018 Precarious, M Contemporary, Woollarah, Sydney
 2016 Unravel, AirSpace Projects, Marrickville, Sydney
 2012 Traces, Incinerator Art Space, Willoughby, Sydney
 2006 Life Boat / Thuyen Cuu Roi, Museum of Ethnology, Hanoi, Vietnam
 2002 Telling Stories, Wentworth Falls School of Art, Blue Mountains, NSW
 1998 Linger, Kidogo Arthouse, Fremantle, Western Australia
 1997 Swarm, mAudespAce, Sydney
 1995 Dream of Black Dogs, aGOG, Canberra
 1995 Recent Work, mAudespAce, Sydney
 1992 Vision and Dreaming, Tamworth City Gallery, Tamworth NSW

Education 

 2016 – 2018 PhD candidate University of Sydney (Suspended due to ill health)
 2007 Master of Fine Art, Sculpture (Research), College of Fine Arts, UNSW
 1997 Master of Art, Sculpture (Coursework), College of Fine Arts, UNSW
 1988 Diploma of Fine Art, Sculpture, Claremont School of Art, Perth

External links 

 Blacktown Arts, exhibiting artist Nerine Martini interview

 Illawarra Mercury, Wollongong sculptures celebrate migrant heritage

 artsACT public art list. Lifeboat/Thuyen Cuu Roi

References 

1968 births
2019 deaths
20th-century Australian women artists
20th-century Australian artists
21st-century Australian women artists
21st-century Australian artists
Australian sculptors